Fecal Immunochemical Test (FIT) is a diagnostic technique that examines stool samples for traces of non-visible blood, which could potentially indicate conditions including colorectal cancer (also known as bowel cancer). Symptoms which could  be caused by bowel cancer and suggest an FIT include a change in bowel habit, anaemia, unexplained weight loss, and abdominal pain.

A 2022 UK guideline recommends the use of a FIT threshold of fHb ≥10 µg Hb/g to select patients with symptoms for an urgent referral for colorectal cancer investigation.

References

Cancer treatments